Anuruddha Ranasinghe Arachchige Roshan (born 25 October 1975) is a Sri Lankan politician, Cabinet Minister, and member of the Parliament of Sri Lanka. He belongs to the Sri Lanka Podujana Peramuna. He currently the Minister of Sports and Youth Affairs and Minister of Irrigation, serving simultaneously since May 23rd, 2022.

Notes

References

Members of the 14th Parliament of Sri Lanka
Members of the 15th Parliament of Sri Lanka
Members of the 16th Parliament of Sri Lanka
Sri Lanka Freedom Party politicians
Living people
1975 births